Moland (also known as Fyresdal or Kyrkjebygdi) is the administrative centre of Fyresdal Municipality in Vestfold og Telemark county, Norway. The village is located at the north end of the lake Fyresvatn. The Moland Church is located in the village (which is why it's sometimes called Kyrkjebygdi which means "the church village").

The village has a primary school, kindergarten, medical centre, retirement home, bank, shops, museum, hotel, airport, petrol stations, and community centre. At the northern end of the village center you will find the Molandsmoen industrial area which is were several companies are located including Telemark Lys and the spring water producer Telemark Kildevann, which produces water from Fyresdal under the brand name Bonaqua Silver. The oldest part of the village dates back to the 1870s, when the village was known as Folkestadbyen. Today, those old buildings are preserved as part of the Vest-Telemark Museum.

References

Fyresdal
Villages in Vestfold og Telemark